The Gambia women's national football team represents the Gambia in international women's football. It is governed by the Gambia Football Federation. As of December 2019, it has only competed in one major international competition, the 2018 Africa Women Cup of Nations qualification. The Gambia has two youth teams, an under-17 side that has competed in FIFA U-17 Women's World Cup qualifiers, and an under-19 side that withdrew from regional qualifiers for an under-19 World Cup. The development of a national team faces challenges similar to those across Africa, although the national football association has four staff members focusing on women's football.

History

The team
In 1985, few countries had women's national football teams. While the sport gained popularity worldwide in later decades, the Gambia's national team only played its first game in 2007. That game was not FIFA-recognized.

The Gambian Senior National Team's first appearance at a major event occurred in April 2018 when they lost a 1–2 result at Burkina Faso in the opening round of qualifying for the 2018 Africa Cup of Nations. In the second leg of the fixture, the Gambia produced a 2–1 victory of their own. As the results of both legs were identical, a penalty shoot-out was required to determine which squad would advance. The Gambia converted all five of its penalty kicks, and advanced to the second round of qualifying. The Gambia drew the defending Cup of Nations champions Nigeria as their second round opponent. They failed to score against the Super Falcons, and were eliminated from the tournament with a 0–7 aggregate line.

The country did not have a FIFA-recognised youth national team until 2012, when the Gambia under-17 women's team competed in Confederation of African Football qualifiers for the FIFA U-17 World Cup, to be held in Azerbaijan in September 2012. The Gambia fielded a team of 24 players, narrowed from an initial pool of 49 young women. Two girls from the SOS Children’s Village Bakoteh were chosen as a members of the team. The Gambia first played Sierra Leone in a pair of qualifying matches for the tournament. The Gambia won the first match 3–0 in Banjul, the Gambia's capital. The return match was delayed for 24 hours and played in Makeni. The Gambia beat Sierra Leone 4–3 to qualify for the final round. The Gambia then beat Tunisia 1–0 at home and won 2–1 in the away fixture. Adama Tamba and Awa Demba scored the Gambia's goals. Tunisia's only goal was a Gambian own goal. The win qualified the Gambia for the 2012 Azerbaijan World Cup.

The Gambia also has an under-19 team that was to play in the 2002 African U-19 Women's Championship. That Gambian squad's first match was to be against Morocco, but the team withdrew from the competition.

Background and development
The development of women's football in Africa faces several challenges, including limited access to education, poverty amongst women, inequalities and human rights abuses targeting women. Funding is another issue impacting the game in Africa, where most financial assistance comes from FIFA and not national football associations. Another challenge is the retention of football players. Many women footballers leave the continent to seek greater opportunity in Europe or the United States.

Gambia's national football association was founded in 1952, and became affiliated with FIFA in 1968. Football is the most popular women's sport in the country, and was first played in an organized system in 1998. A national competition was launched in 2007, the same year FIFA started an education course on football for women.
Competition was active on both the national and scholastic levels by 2009. There are four staffers dedicated to women's football in the Gambia Football Association, and representation of women on the board is required by the association's charter.

Death of Fatim Jawara
In September 2016, Fatim Jawara, a member of the national team, left Serekunda in her homeland the Gambia and crossed the Sahara Desert to Libya. In November 2016, she travelled with others on two boats across the Mediterranean Sea, heading towards the Lampedusa island of Italy. She did this as she sought to smuggle herself into Europe, where the national team was due to play Casa Sports F.C. from Senegal as part of a festival to celebrate women's football. Due to a severe storm, their boats capsized and Jawara drowned at the age of 19, with her family was contacted several days after the tragedy. Lamin Kaba Bajo, President of the Gambia Football Federation, said "We are grieving at the moment as this is a great loss to the national soccer team and the nation."

Team image

Home stadium

Results and fixtures

The following is a list of match results in the last 12 months, as well as any future matches that have been scheduled.

Legend

2022

2023

Coaching staff

Current coaching staff

Manager history

 Bubacarr Jallow (????–2022)
    Bubacarr Jallow(2022–)

Players

Current squad
This is the   convened selection for the 2023 WAFU Zone A Women's Cup on January 2022 .

Caps and goals accurate up to and including 19 June 2021.
List of players still not update

Recent call-ups
The following players have been called up to a Gambia squad in the past 12 months.

Previous squads
WAFU Zone A Women's Cup
2023 WAFU Zone A Women's Cup squads

Records

*Active players in bold, statistics correct as of 1 August 2021.

Most capped players

Top goalscorers

Competitive record

FIFA Women's World Cup

*Draws include knockout matches decided on penalty kicks.

Olympic Games

Africa Women Cup of Nations

*Draws include knockout matches decided on penalty kicks.

African Games

WAFU Women's Cup record

Honours

Regional
WAFU Zone A Women's Cup
3rd Place (1): 2023

All−time record against FIFA recognized nations
The list shown below shows the Djibouti national football team all−time international record against opposing nations.
*As of xxxxxx after match against xxxx.
Key

Record per opponent
*As ofxxxxx after match against xxxxx.
Key

The following table shows Djibouti's all-time official international record per opponent:

See also

Sport in the Gambia
Football in the Gambia
Women's football in the Gambia
Gambia national football team
Women's football

References

African women's national association football teams
women